Garg may refer to:

 Garg (surname), an Indian surname (including a list of people with the name)
 Garg (gotra), an Indian gotra
 Garga (sage), the name of several sages in ancient India
 The Garg (disambiguation), nickname for two newspapers

See also 
 Garga (disambiguation)
 Gargantua (disambiguation)